The 1978 United States Senate election in Wyoming was held on November 7, 1978. Incumbent Republican Senator Clifford Hansen declined to seek a third term in office. Former State Representative Alan K. Simpson, the son of former Senator Milward Simpson, won a contested Republican primary and faced Raymond B. Whitaker, the 1960 Democratic nominee for the Senate, in the general election. Despite a favorable environment for Republicans nationwide, Simpson's performance decreased considerably from Hansen's 1972 landslide. Nonetheless, he easily defeated Whitaker, winning 62% of the vote to Whitaker's 38%.

Republican primary

Candidates
 Alan K. Simpson, former State Representative from Park County
 Hugh Binford, petroleum engineer and businessman
 Gordon H. Barrows, author
 James G. Maxey, project manager

Results

Democratic primary

Candidates
 Raymond B. Whitaker, former Natrona County Prosecuting Attorney, 1960 Democratic nominee for U.S. Senate
 Dean M. Larson, Riverton attorney
 Charles Carroll, former Deputy Wyoming Attorney General, 1974 Democratic nominee for Wyoming Secretary of State

Results

General election

Results

See also 
 1978 United States Senate elections

References 

Wyoming
1978
1978 Wyoming elections